Alexandra Herbríková (born 13 October 1992) is a pair skater who competes with Nicolas Roulet for Switzerland. They are the 2014 NRW Trophy silver medalists and three-time Swiss national champions.

Career 
Herbríková began learning to skate in 1996. Early in her career, she represented the Czech Republic with Lukáš Ovčáček. She Alexandr Zaboev, and Rudy Halmaert.  

With Halmaert, she is the 2012 Czech national champion and placed 13th at the 2012 European Championships.

In 2013, Herbríková teamed up with Swiss skater Nicolas Roulet. The two decided to compete for Switzerland. They won the silver medal at the 2014 NRW Trophy and finished 16th at the 2016 European Championships.

Programs

With Roulet

With Halmaert

With Zaboev

With Ovčáček

Competitive highlights 
GP: Grand Prix; CS: Challenger Series; JGP: Junior Grand Prix

With Roulet for Switzerland

With Ovčáček, Zaboev, and Halmaert for the Czech Republic

Singles career

References

External links 

 

Czech female pair skaters
1992 births
Living people
Sportspeople from Bojnice
Swiss female pair skaters